Grudna may refer to the following places:
Grudna, Nowy Tomyśl County in Greater Poland Voivodeship (west-central Poland)
Grudna, Oborniki County in Greater Poland Voivodeship (west-central Poland)
Grudna, Łódź Voivodeship (central Poland)